Utsmiyurt (Utsmuyurt) is a rural locality (a selo) in Babayurtovsky District, Republic of Dagestan, Russia. The population was 3,541 as of 2010. There are 33 streets.

Geography 
Utsmiyurt is located on the right bank of the Terek River, 33 km southwest of Babayurt (the district's administrative centre) by road. Dzerzhinskoye is the nearest rural locality.

References 

Rural localities in Babayurtovsky District